Briar Schwaller-Hürlimann (born 30 September 1993 as Briar Hürlimann) is a Swiss curler from Recherswil. She currently plays lead on Team Silvana Tirinzoni.

Career
Schwaller-Hürlimann first represented Switzerland on the international stage at the 2011 World Junior Curling Championships as third for Manuela Siegrist. They lost the tiebreaker to Sweden's Jonna McManus. She returned the following year at the 2012 World Junior Curling Championships, playing third for Melanie Barbezat. They were less successful than the previous year, finishing with a 3–6 record. After not representing Switzerland in 2013, Schwaller-Hürlimann made back to back appearances at the World Juniors. In 2014, they lost the tiebreaker 7–6 to Sweden's Isabella Wranå. In 2015, they won the bronze medal after defeating Wranå's Swedish team. Also in 2015, she finished fifth at the 2015 World Mixed Curling Championship, playing third for Yannick Schwaller.

During the 2015–16 season, Schwaller-Hürlimann spared for Team Alina Pätz at the 2016 Players' Championship, in place of Marisa Winkelhausen. It was her first Grand Slam of Curling event. The team finished with a 1–4 record, only defeating Anna Sidorova's Russian rink.

In 2017, Schwaller-Hürlimann represented Switzerland at the 2017 Winter Universiade. This time, they could not defeat Wranå in the bronze medal game, settling for fourth. She also played in her first World Women's Curling Championships this season, as the alternate for 2015 World Champion Alina Pätz. She did not play in any games and the Swiss team settled for 8th after a 5–6 round robin record.

The 2018–19 season was a breakout year for Schwaller-Hürlimann and her team of skip Elena Stern, second Lisa Gisler and lead Céline Koller. They played in four Grand Slam events including winning the 2018 Tour Challenge Tier 2 and the 2018 Women's Masters Basel World Curling Tour event.

Team Stern followed their great season with an even better one for the 2019–20 season. They had a quarterfinal finish at the 2019 Cameron's Brewing Oakville Fall Classic. They missed the playoffs at their next three events, the 2019 Stu Sells Oakville Tankard, the 2019 AMJ Campbell Shorty Jenkins Classic and the inaugural WCT Uiseong International Curling Cup. Next, Team Stern played in the 2019 Canad Inns Women's Classic and qualified for the playoffs threw the C side. They successfully defeated Eve Muirhead in the quarterfinals, Silvana Tirinzoni in the semifinals and Rachel Homan in the final to win the event. They also won the International Bernese Ladies Cup and the Schweizer Cup. For the first time ever, they qualified for the playoffs at a Grand Slam event where they lost to Tracy Fleury in the quarterfinals at the Masters. They also qualified for the playoffs as the number one seed at the National but they also lost in the quarterfinals, this time to Satsuki Fujisawa. Team Stern surprised many when they upset the defending world champion rink Silvana Tirinzoni in the 2020 Swiss Women's Curling Championship three times and defeated them in the final 6–4. The team was set to represent Switzerland at the 2020 World Women's Curling Championship before the event got cancelled due to the COVID-19 pandemic. The Swiss championship would be their last event of the season as both the Players' Championship and the Champions Cup Grand Slam events were also cancelled due to the pandemic.

The Stern team began the abbreviated 2020–21 season by winning the 2020 Schweizer Cup, defeating Team Tirinzoni in the final. The team next played in the 2020 Women's Masters Basel, losing in the semifinals to Raphaela Keiser. Two weeks later, they competed in the 2.0 Cup, a men's tour event as the sole women's team. They lost in the C Qualifier game to Sweden's Fredrik Nyman. In January 2021, Schwaller-Hürlimann compted at the 2021 Swiss Mixed Doubles Curling Championship with partner Yannick Schwaller. The pair finished atop of the round robin standings with a 6–1 record, sending them directly to the best-of-three final where they played Alina Pätz and Sven Michel. They defeated Pätz / Michel two games to zero to claim the Swiss Mixed Doubles title. The pair then played against the 2020 Swiss champion rink of Jenny Perret and Martin Rios to decide who would represent Switzerland at the 2021 World Mixed Doubles Curling Championship. They lost the best-of-five series three games to zero. At the 2021 Swiss Women's Curling Championship, Team Stern could not defend their title, losing all five of their matches against the Tirinzoni rink. As they had won the Swiss Championship in 2020 but could not participate in the World Championship due to the cancellation, they played Team Tirinzoni in a best-of-five series to determine which team would represent Switzerland at the 2021 World Women's Curling Championship. Tirinzoni defeated Stern three games to zero in the series, earning themselves the spot at the World Championship. The team ended their season at the 2021 Champions Cup and 2021 Players' Championship Grand Slam events, which were played in a "curling bubble" in Calgary, Alberta, with no spectators, to avoid the spread of the coronavirus. The team finished winless in the Champions Cup and made the quarterfinals at the Players'. At the end of the season, Schwaller-Hürlimann and Schwaller won the 2021 WCT Arctic Cup in Dudinka, Russia.

After Team Tirinzoni qualified to represent Switzerland at the 2022 Winter Olympics, Elena Stern and Lisa Gisler both retired from competitive curling with Schwaller-Hürlimann and Céline Koller disbanding as well. She then joined her sister Corrie Hürlimann's team for the 2021–22 season. The team did not have much success on tour, only reaching one final at the Stu Sells 1824 Halifax Classic where they lost to Suzanne Birt. At the 2022 Swiss Women's Curling Championship, they finished fourth after a semifinal loss to the Tirinzoni rink. Schwaller-Hürlimann only remained with her sister for one season as on May 12, it was announced that she would be joining the new Tirinzoni rink at lead for the 2022–23 season. The team also included fourth Alina Pätz and second Carole Howald.

Personal life
Schwaller-Hürlimann's parents Janet Hürlimann and Patrick Hürlimann were also both curlers. Her father won a gold medal at the 1998 Winter Olympics. She is currently employed as a teacher. In July 2022 she married fellow curler Yannick Schwaller and changed her surname to Schwaller-Hürlimann.

Grand Slam record

Teams

Notes

References

External links

 Team Stern's Home Page

Swiss female curlers
Living people
1993 births
People from Cham, Switzerland
Sportspeople from the canton of Zug
Sportspeople from the canton of Solothurn
People from Zug
Swiss people of Canadian descent
Competitors at the 2017 Winter Universiade